Pavetta intermedia is a species of plant in the family Rubiaceae. It is found in the Democratic Republic of the Congo and Uganda.

References

intermedia
Vulnerable plants
Taxonomy articles created by Polbot